The 2016 Dubai 24 Hour was the 11th running of the Dubai 24 Hour. The event was held on 14 to 16 January at the Dubai Autodrome, United Arab Emirates.

Result

References

Dubai 24 Hour
Dubai 24 Hour
Dubai 24 Hour
Dubai 24 Hour